Ignacy Julian Cejzyk (1779–1858) was a Polish artist and forger.

1779 births
1858 deaths
Polish artists
Forgers